Vinícius Alberto Nunes or simply Vinícius  (born January 7, 1988 in Capivari), is a Brazilian player at the positions of left back and midfielder. He currently plays for Ituano Futebol Clube.

Made professional debut for Palmeiras in a 2-1 home win over Náutico in the Campeonato Brasileiro on October 4, 2007.

External links
 CBF
 Guardian Stats Centre
 palmeiras.globo.com

1988 births
Living people
Brazilian footballers
Sociedade Esportiva Palmeiras players
Association football defenders